Abdel Ghani Loukil (born 10 June 1973) is an Algerian handball player. He competed in the men's tournament at the 1996 Summer Olympics.

References

1973 births
Living people
Algerian male handball players
Olympic handball players of Algeria
Handball players at the 1996 Summer Olympics
21st-century Algerian people